Andarud-e Olya (also Romanized as Andarūd-e ‘Olyā, Andarūd ‘Olyā, and Andrūd-e ‘Olyā; also known as Andarūd, Andarūd-e Bālā, and Andrūd-e Bālā) is a village in Kaghazkonan-e Markazi Rural District, Kaghazkonan District, Meyaneh County, East Azerbaijan Province, Iran. At the 2006 census, its population was 61, in 31 families.

References 

Populated places in Meyaneh County